Tour Michelet is an office skyscraper in Puteaux, in La Défense, the business district of the Paris metropolitan area. It notably hosts the company Total.

When it was completed in 1985, the 127 meter high office tower was the ninth tallest in the La Défense business district. The building has 34 floors and an area of approximately 75,750 square meters.

See also 
 La Défense
 List of tallest buildings and structures in the Paris region
 List of tallest buildings in France

References

External links 
 Tour Michelet 

Michelet
La Défense
Office buildings completed in 1985